Governor Maitland may refer to:

Frederick Maitland (1763–1848), Governor of Grenada from 1805 to 1811
Peregrine Maitland (1777–1854), Governor of Nova Scotia from 1828 to 1834 and Governor of the Cape Colony from 1844 to 1847
Thomas Maitland (British Army officer) (1760–1824), Governor of Ceylon from 1805 to 1811 and Governor of Malta from 1813 to 1824